Chakra is a free and open-source JavaScript engine developed by Microsoft for its Microsoft Edge Legacy web browser. It is a fork of the same-named JScript engine used in Internet Explorer. Like the EdgeHTML browser engine, the declared intention was that it would reflect the "Living Web". The core components of Chakra were open-sourced as ChakraCore.

Standards support
Chakra supports ECMAScript 5.1 with partial support for ECMAScript 2015.

Open sourcing
Following an initial announcement on December 5, 2015, Microsoft open sourced the Chakra engine as ChakraCore, including all the key components of the JavaScript engine powering Microsoft Edge on their GitHub page under the MIT License on January 13, 2016. ChakraCore is essentially the same as the Chakra engine that powers the Microsoft Edge browser, but with platform-agnostic bindings, i.e. without the specific interfaces utilised within the Universal Windows App platform.

Microsoft has also created a project on GitHub that allows Node.js to use ChakraCore as its JavaScript engine instead of V8.

References

External links

JavaScript engines
Microsoft free software
Free software programmed in C++
Software using the MIT license